Catherine Hiegel (born 10 December 1946) is a French actress, comedian and director.

Personal life
Catherine Hiegel is the daughter of Pierre Hiegel, radio host, music critic, radio producer and artistic director of French houses of discs. She is also the niece of Pierre Bellemare.

Career
At ten, she played Cosette in a radio adaptation of Les Misérables, where her father played Jean Valjean. She sang in 1956 with André Claveau, Viens danser avec papa.

On the advice of her father, she stopped school to learn comedy. She took lessons with Raymond Girard and Jacques Charon, and began her career on stage to the Théâtre des Bouffes-Parisiens with Cactus Flower, alongside Jean Poiret and Sophie Desmarets. She joined the French National Academy of Dramatic Arts in the classes of Jean Marchat then Lise Delamare, and also attended classes of Jean-Laurent Cochet.

She joined the Comédie-Française in 1969. She worked with directors as varied as Philippe Adrien, Patrice Chéreau, Dario Fo, Jorge Lavelli, Jean-Paul Roussillon, in the classical and contemporary repertoire. She became Dean of the troupe after the death of Christine Fersen in 2008.

Catherine Hiegel is also a professor to the CNSAD for thirteen years.

She have won 2 Molière Award on 5 nominations.

Theater

Filmography

References

External links

Living people
French film actresses
French television actresses
1946 births
20th-century French actresses
21st-century French actresses
People from Montreuil, Seine-Saint-Denis
French National Academy of Dramatic Arts alumni